The Hon. Robert Francis Green (November 14, 1861 – October 5, 1946) was a Canadian businessman and Conservative politician, born in Peterborough, Canada West. From 1893 to 1897, Green served three terms as mayor of Kaslo, British Columbia. He was a member of the Legislative Assembly of British Columbia from 1898 to 1907, representing the ridings of first Slocan then Kaslo. After the 1903 BC elections, Green was part of the government of Richard McBride, and was appointed Minister of Mines, Education, and Lands and Works, and Provincial Secretary.

He was elected MP for Kootenay in 1912 and re-elected in the successor riding Kootenay West in 1917. At the end of that term in 1921, he was appointed to the Senate, where he served until his death at the age of 86.

External links
 

Conservative Party of Canada (1867–1942) MPs
Members of the House of Commons of Canada from British Columbia
British Columbia Conservative Party MLAs
1861 births
1946 deaths
Canadian senators from British Columbia
Conservative Party of Canada (1867–1942) senators
Mayors of places in British Columbia